Henry Lewis "Harry" Solter (November 19, 1873 – March 2, 1920) was an American silent film actor, screenwriter and director.

Career

Solter began his career as an actor in 1908 with Biograph Studios. That same year he met actress Florence Lawrence while making the film Romeo and Juliet for Vitagraph Studios and married on August 30 of that year. In 1909, Solter began working for Carl Laemmle's Independent Moving Pictures Co. of America (IMP) as an actor but also as a director. Over the next nine years, he directed 148 silent films.

In 1912, Harry Solter and his wife established the Victor Studios in Fort Lee, New Jersey. In 1913, they sold out to Carl Laemmle whose amalgamation of several studios created the colossal Universal Film Manufacturing Co. Solter continued to direct for the new company until 1918 when health problems emerged. With this new prosperity, Florence was able to realize a 'lifelong dream,' buying a  estate in River Vale, New Jersey.

Death
Solter died of a stroke on March 2, 1920, at the age of 46. He is interred in the Baltimore Cemetery in Baltimore, Maryland.

Selected filmography

References

External links
 
 

1873 births
1920 deaths
20th-century American male actors
American male film actors
American male screenwriters
American male silent film actors
Film directors from Maryland
Male actors from Baltimore
People from River Vale, New Jersey
Film directors from New Jersey
Screenwriters from New Jersey
Screenwriters from Maryland
Silent film screenwriters
20th-century American male writers
20th-century American screenwriters